Kyle Jones may refer to:
Kyle Jones (politician) (born 1955), musician, archivist and former Maine state politician
Kyle Jones (Canadian football) (born 1986), Canadian football linebacker
Kyle Jones (triathlete) (born 1984), Canadian triathlete
Kyle C. Jones, American voice actor, director, script writer and producer for anime